Speiredonia hogenesi is a species of moth of the family Erebidae first described by Alberto Zilli in 2002. It is found in Malaya, Sumatra, Java and Borneo.

External links
 

Moths described in 2002
Speiredonia